Olivia Bertrand (born 2 January 1989 in Évian-les-Bains) is a French Alpine skier and non-commissioned officer.

She made her debut at the FIS Alpine Ski World Cup on 15 December 2006, and her best World Cup placing is two 12th places in the giant slalom from 2009.

Bertrand competed for France at the 2010 Winter Olympics and finished in 12th place in the Alpine skiing at the 2010 Winter Olympics – Women's giant slalom.

References

External links 
 
 
 Personal website

1989 births
Living people
People from Évian-les-Bains
French female alpine skiers
Olympic alpine skiers of France
Alpine skiers at the 2010 Winter Olympics
Sportspeople from Haute-Savoie